Jocara ragonoti is a species of snout moth in the genus Jocara. It is found in Puerto Rico.

The larvae have been recorded feeding on Conocarpus erectus.

References

Moths described in 1890
Jocara